These are partial results of the athletics competition at the 2013 Islamic Solidarity Games which took place between 25 and 29 September 2013 in Palembang, Indonesia.

Men's results

100 metres

Heats – 25 SeptemberWind:Heat 1: -0.8 m/s, Heat 2: -0.2 m/s, Heat 3: -1.5 m/s

Final – 25 SeptemberWind:0.0 m/s

200 metres

Heats – 27 SeptemberWind:Heat 1: +0.1 m/s, Heat 2: +0.3 m/s, Heat 3: +1.2 m/s, Heat 4: -0.2 m/s

Final – 27 SeptemberWind:-0.4 m/s

400 metres

Heats – 25 September

Final – 26 September

800 metres

Heats – 25 September

Final – 26 September

1500 metres
28 September

5000 metres
28 September

10,000 metres
25 September

110 metres hurdles
25 SeptemberWind: +0.2 m/s

400 metres hurdles
27 September

3000 metres steeplechase
26 September

4 × 100 metres relay
28 September

4 × 400 metres relay
28 September

20 kilometres walk
29 September

High jump
25 September

Pole vault
28 September

Long jump
26 September

Triple jump
28 September

Shot put
25 September

Discus throw
26 September

Hammer throw
27 September

Javelin throw
27 September

Women's results

100 metres

Heats – 25 SeptemberWind:Heat 1: -0.3 m/s, Heat 2: -1.0 m/s

Final – 25 SeptemberWind:-0.3 m/s

200 metres
27 SeptemberWind: -0.1 m/s

400 metres
26 September

800 metres
26 September

1500 metres
28 September

5000 metres
27 September

10,000 metres
26 September

100 metres hurdles
28 SeptemberWind: +0.7 m/s

400 metres hurdles
27 September

3000 metres steeplechase
26 September

4 × 100 metres relay
28 September

4 × 400 metres relay
28 September

High jump
26 September

Pole vault
26 September

Long jump
25 September

Triple jump
27 September

Shot put
26 September

Discus throw
25 September

|}

Javelin throw
25 September

References

Islamic Solidarity Games
2013